Great Malvern Priory in Malvern, Worcestershire, England, was a Benedictine monastery (c. 1075 – 1540) and is now an Anglican parish church. In 1949 it was designated a Grade I listed building. It is a dominant building in the Great Malvern Conservation area. It has the largest display of 15th-century stained glass in England, as well as carved miserichords from the 15th and 16th century and the largest collection of medieval floor and wall tiles. In 1860 major restoration work was carried out by Sir George Gilbert Scott. It is also the venue for concerts and civic services.

History

Early history
An ancient carved head and shoulders similar to the Lustymore Island figure on Boa Island, County Fermanagh, was excavated from the grounds of the Priory. It is now housed in St Ann's Chapel. A Celt (a prehistoric axe-like tool) was also excavated during the 18th Century.

Little is known about Malvern over the next thousand years until it is described as "... an hermitage, or some kind of religious house, for seculars, before the conquest, endowed by the gift of Edward the Confessor". The additions to William Dugdale's Monasticon include an extract from the Pleas taken before the King at York in 1387, stating that there was a congregation of hermits at Malvern "some time before the conquest". Several slightly different histories explain the actual founding of the religious community. Legend tells that the settlement began following the murder of St. Werstan, a monk of Deerhurst, who fled from the Danes and took refuge in the woods of Malvern where the above-mentioned hermitage had been established. St Werstan's oratory is thought to have been located on the site of St Michael's Chapel which is believed to have stood on the site of Bello Sguardo, a Victorian Villa. Bello Sguardo was built on the site of Hermitage Cottage. The cottage was demolished in 1825 and ecclesiastical carvings were found within it. A Mediaeval undercroft, human bones and parts of a coffin were also uncovered. Although the legend may be monastic mythology, historians have concluded that St. Werstan was the original martyr.

Norman Conquest to the Dissolution

During the reign of Edward the Confessor, Saint Wulfstan, the Bishop of Worcester, encouraged a hermit named Aldwyn to become the first Prior of Malvern Priory. The monastery was in what was then the wilderness of Malvern Chase. According to the Worcester Monastic Annals, this work began in 1085. An ancient stained glass window in the Priory church depicts the legend of St. Werstan, with details of his vision, the consecration of his chapel, Edward the Confessor granting the charter for the site, and Werstan's martyrdom.

Aldwyn was succeeded by Walcher of Malvern, an astronomer and philosopher from Lorraine. Walcher's tomb lid was rescued from burial at the site of the South Transept cloister garth c. 1711. It is now housed in St Anne's chapel. The inscription on the lid reads:

Philosophus bonus dignus Astrologus lotharingus, Vir pius et humilis, Monachus prior hujus ovilis Hic jacet in cista Geometricus et Abacista, Doctor Walcherus. Flet plebs, dolet undique clerus. Huic lux prima mori Dedit Octobris seniori; Vivat ut in coelis Exoret quisque fidelis. MCXXXV.

A good philosopher, a worthy Astrologer of Lorraine, A pious and humble man, the prior monk of this fold, Here lies in a casket, a geometer skilled in the abacus, Doctor Walcher. The people weeps, the cleric grieves everywhere. To him, our elder, the first day of October brought death; That he should live in heaven may every faithful soul pray. 1135.

The priory was built for thirty monks on land belonging to Westminster Abbey. A charter from Henry I in 1128 AD refers to Great Malvern Priory as 'the Priory of St. Mary'. In 1154–1156, Westminster Abbey obtained a Papal bull from Pope Adrian IV which confirms a strong dependency of the priory of St Mary, Malvern, on the Abbey of Westminster.

An 18th-century document in the Worcester County Record Office states that in the 18th year of King William's reign (1083?), the priory was dedicated to St Mary the Virgin. Within the Victorian History of the Counties of England: A History of Worcester, edited by W. Page, there is an account of the foundation of the monastery in Bishop Guilford's Register of 1283. It describes how hermit Aldwyn petitioned Urse d'Abetot, the Earl of Gloucester, for the original site (of the Priory) in the wood, and land "as far as Baldeyate"; that he collected monks, and adopted the Rule of St. Benedict; dedicating the monastery to the Virgin Mary – but occasionally under patronage of both St. Mary & St. Michael.

On the Dissolution of the Monasteries in 1541, local people raised £20 to buy the building to replace their decaying parish church.

Modern renaissance

By 1788 the Priory had fallen into disrepair. It was partly restored in 1812 and again in 1816, 1834 and 1841. A careful restoration was carried out in 1860 under the direction of Sir George Gilbert Scott, the famous architect, who also designed the roof of the nave in imitation of the medieval original.

Present day
The church has around 350 on the parochial council electoral roll. Services are a mixture of traditional elements with some modern elements. The choir is well established. There are several active groups for children and young people. The church sponsors several "Mission Partners".

The current incumbent is The Revd Rod Corke, who is the Vicar of Malvern. A past incumbent was the Christian writer Anthony C. Deane.

The building was given Grade I listed status, protecting it from unauthorised modifications or demolition.

Architecture

The present building dates from 1085, with mainly 15th-century structure, floor, and wall tiles. Extensions to the original Norman architecture church began around 1440 in the Perpendicular style and work continued until 1502. The great square central tower is very similar to that of the nearby Gloucester Cathedral; it was built by the same masons. It was redesigned in Perpendicular style by Sir Reginald Bray and has a very plain interior. The chancel is also Perpendicular in style, and contains the monument of John Knotsford (died 1589), a participant in the dissolution of the former monastic foundation. It is largely thanks to his patronage that the church, and particularly its medieval glass, survived so well.

Windows

The fine collection of stained glass ranges from medieval to modern, and includes 15th century and 19th century windows. The north transept window, depicting the Coronation of St. Mary, was a gift from Henry VII in 1501, and another from the Duke of Gloucester, later Richard III.

Interior

Monuments

The monuments include a recumbent figure of a knight dating from 1200 and an alabaster altar tomb with effigies to John Knottesford (1589), his wife Jane and their daughter, Anne. Within the sacristy are several heraldic floor stones dedicated to the Lygon family. St Ann's Chapel houses the tomb lid of Walcher of Malvern, the second prior of Malvern.

Organ

The organ is by Nicholson of Malvern from 1879, but was heavily rebuilt and restored by Rushworth and Dreaper in 1927 and 1977. It was further overhauled by Nicholson in 2003 and is a Certified Historic Organ. The specification of the organ is listed at the National Pipe Organ Register.

Organists

1818 John Southall
1836 William Reeves
1840 Mrs William Walker
1843 Thomas Bissell
1843 George Norman
1847 John Roberts Boulcott (formerly assistant organist of Worcester Cathedral, later organist of Church of the Holy Trinity, Stratford-upon-Avon)
1847 Alfred Wheeler
1850 William Haynes
1893 Allan Pattison (formerly organist of St. Michael's College, Tenbury)
1895 Charles de Sousa
1899 Alban Claughton
1904 Frederick William Wadely
1910 Louis Hamand
1946 John Durham Holl
1973 Harold Hullah
1977 Richard Dacey
1980 Graham Davies
1983 Tony Hemson
1984 David Cooper
1996 Nicholas Woods
1999 Nigel McClintock
2000 Andrew Wilson
2006 Martyn Lane
2008 David Iliff
2012 Piers Maxim

Misericords

The twenty-two 15th century misericords and twelve 19th-century misericords are divided into three subsets: a modern set that do not seem to follow a pattern, depictions of mythical beasts and representations of the Labours of the Months. It appears that some of the modern misericords replaced 5 of the labours, but this is still a useful record.

It is possible that the same person who carved the misericords at Worcester Cathedral and St Mary's Church in Ripple, Worcestershire was responsible for the 15th-century misericords, as they bear more than a family resemblance.

Labours of the Month
 NH-02	Swine-herd, dressed in the usual flat cap, doublet and hose, and pointed shoes, knocking down acorns. Representing October.
 NH-06	Man with bag fastened to a strap over his shoulders with a seed container on his left. He is a seed-sower and represents March.
 NB-01	Man seated at a table holding up a wine cup in each hand. Probably representing January.
 NB-02	Man reaping or weeding. In his hands he holds two implements to tend the corn. Possibly representing April, June or August.
 NB-04	Man with a scythe. Representing June.
 NB-05	Smiling man carrying a bunch of grapes in his left hand and a basket in his right. Representing September.
 SB-06	Man holding a large bunch of flowers in each hand. Representing May.

Medieval wall tiles
Great Malvern Priory has a large collection of over a thousand Medieval wall tiles. The majority were made between 1453 and 1458.

See also

List of English abbeys, priories and friaries serving as parish churches

Gallery

Further reading

  Also published in 2008 by Kessinger Publishing. 

 (Note: this is the full title and sub-title of the book as found on the title page, displayed here to give a sense of the writing style while still being readable).
Louis Arthur Hamand, The Ancient Windows of Great Malvern Priory Church, Campfield Press, St. Albans, 1947.
Gordon McNeil Rushforth, Medieval Christian Imagery as Illustrated by the Painted Windows of Great Malvern Priory Church Worcestershire, Clarendon Press, Oxford, 1947.
Heather Gilderdale Scott, Lay figures in sacred spaces: the 15th-century 'donor figures' at Great Malvern Priory, Worcestershire, The Journal of Stained Glass, 29, 12–23, 2005.

References

External links

Great Malvern Priory
Catalogue of Stained Glass
Sacred Destinations - Malvern Priory

Christian monasteries established in the 11th century
Buildings and structures in Malvern, Worcestershire
Church of England church buildings in Worcestershire
Monasteries in Worcestershire
Tourist attractions in Worcestershire
Benedictine monasteries in England
Grade I listed buildings in Worcestershire
1085 establishments in England
1541 disestablishments in England
Pre-Reformation Roman Catholic cathedrals
Malvern, Worcestershire
Monasteries dissolved under the English Reformation